Eleni Oikonomopulou (Greek: Ελένη Οικονομοπούλου, 1912–1999) was a Greek artist.  She was born in 1912 in Patras and she was a descendant of a Greek Revolutionary leader of 1821.  She attended the Ursuline School in Nafplio and later entered the Arsakeio in Patras.  In music, she studied at the Patras Odeum and later at the Athens Odeum. She taught for a few years at the Patras and the Aigio Odeums. She was a doctor during World War II.

In 1946, she was asked to edit the music page for the newly published magazine known as I Zoi tou Paidiou (Child's Life). From then on, she began composing children's songs. She also wrote four oratorios.

References
The first version of the article is translated and is based from the article at the Greek Wikipedia (el:Main Page)

1912 births
1996 deaths
Artists from Patras
Musicians from Patras